In Japanese, encyclopedias are known as hyakka jiten, which literally means "book of a hundred subjects," and can trace their origins to the early Heian period, in the ninth century. Encyclopedic works were published in Japan for well over a thousand years before Japan's first modern encyclopedias were published after Japan's opening to the West, during the Meiji Period (1868–1912).  Several encyclopedias have been published in Japan since World War II, including several children's encyclopedias, and two major titles are currently available:  the Encyclopedia Nipponica, published by Shogakukan, and the Sekai Dai-Hyakka Jiten, compiled by the Heibonsha publishing company. A Japanese Wikipedia is also available.

History 

The antecedents of the modern Japanese encyclopedia date from the ancient period and the Middle Ages. Encyclopedic books were imported from China from an early date, but the first proto-encyclopedia produced in Japan was the 1000-scroll Hifuryaku, compiled in 831 upon the emperor's orders by Shigeno no Sadanushi and others, only fragments of which survive today. The first truly Japanese-style encyclopedia is said to be Minamoto no Shitagō's 10-scroll work, Wamyō Ruijushō, which was written in the ancient Japanese syllabary system of man'yōgana and contained entries arranged by category. During the 13th century, an 11-scroll book appeared on the origins of things, Chiribukuro (literally, “rubbish bag”), and its innovative question-and-answer format was much imitated throughout the medieval period.

In the 17th century, the Sancai Tuhui (Sansai Zue in Japanese) (literally, "illustrated book of the 'Three Powers,' i.e., heaven, earth, and man"), a 14-part, 106-scroll illustrated encyclopedia published in Ming China in 1609, entered Japan. In 1712, emulating the Sancai Tuhui, Terajima Ryōan published the Wakan Sansai Zue ("illustrated book of the three powers in Japan and China"), the first Japanese illustrated encyclopedia. Its logical presentation, topical divisions, and discussion of alternative explanations for the same phenomena, however, anticipated the modern encyclopedia.

During Japan's  at the time of the Meiji Period, the westernizer Nishi Amane compiled Japan's first modern encyclopedia, the Hyakugaku renkan. Beginning in 1873, the Ministry of Education sponsored the translation of Chambers' Information for the People into Japanese under the name Hyakka Zensho (the "Comprehensive Encyclopedia"), which was completed in the 1880s. Later, the Ministry of Temples and Shrines sponsored the compilation by Nishimura Shigeki and others of another encyclopedic work, the Koji ruien, which was finally completed in 1914. The publishing house Sanseido published its 10-volume encyclopedia, the Nihon Hyakka Daijiten (the "Great Japan Encyclopedia"), between 1908 and 1919, and Heibonsha published a 28-volume work, the Dai-Hyakka Jiten (the "Great Encyclopedia"), between 1931 and 1934.

After World War II, Heibonsha responded to Japan's new internationalization by publishing the Sekai Dai-Hyakka Jiten (the "Great World Encyclopedia") in 32 volumes, between 1955 and 1959. Shogakukan then published the 19-volume Encyclopedia Japonica, Japan's first full-color reference work, between 1967 and 1972. Between 1970 and 1974, Gakushu Kenkyusha published a 21-volume encyclopedia, the Gurando Gendai Hyakka Jiten (the "Great Modern Encyclopedia"). In 1974 and 1975, a 30-volume Japanese version of the Encyclopædia Britannica, the Buritanica Kokusai Hyakka Jiten (the "Britannica International Encyclopedia"), was also published in Japan. In 1984, Heibonsha returned with a 16-volume compilation, the Dai-Hyakka Jiten (the "Great Encyclopedia"), and Shogakukan began publishing a 25-volume encyclopedia, the Nihon Dai-Hyakka Zensho (literally, the "Japan Comprehensive Encyclopedia," but officially known by the English title, Encyclopedia Nipponica) the same year, finishing in 1989. A second edition was published in 1994. Various children's encyclopedias were also published in the 1950s and 1960s.

Major currently available Japanese print encyclopedias

Encyclopedia Nipponica

 is an encyclopedia published by Shogakukan in Japan. It is published in five formats: traditional book form, CD-ROM, e-book, Internet, and as an i-Mode service. Both the Internet and i-Mode versions require payment to use.

Sekai Dai-Hyakka Jiten

The Sekai Dai–Hyakka Jiten (literally the “World Comprehensive Encyclopedia”) is an encyclopedia compiled by the Japanese publisher Heibonsha. It is published in three formats: traditional book form, CD-ROM, and Internet.

Subject-specific encyclopedias

Nihon Rekishi Chimei Taikei
The  is a fifty-volume encyclopedia published by Heibonsha between 1979 and 2005.

Digital and online encyclopedias

The advent of personal computers and the Internet has brought encyclopedias into the digital age. In addition to the Japanese version of Wikipedia, the Encyclopædia Britannica and Microsoft's Encarta both appear on CD-ROM in Japanese versions.

Other Japan related encyclopedias

Though not technically a Japanese encyclopedia because it is not written in Japanese, the Kodansha Encyclopedia of Japan is an English-language encyclopedia on Japan, first published by Kodansha in 1983, supplemented in 1986, and revised in 1993. An online version of this encyclopedia also exists at www.ency-japan.com.

References

 This article relies on articles from Encyclopedia Nipponica (1994 ed.) and the Japanese Wikipedia.